In America: A Lexicon of Fashion was a 2021–2022 high fashion art exhibition of the Anna Wintour Costume Center, a wing of the Metropolitan Museum of Art (MMA) which houses the collection of the Costume Institute. Approximately 100 men’s and women’s ensembles by a diverse range of designers from the 1940s to the present are featured. Enclosed in scrimmed cases that represent three-dimensional "patches" of a quilt, they are organized into 12 sections that explore defining emotional qualities: Nostalgia, Belonging, Delight, Joy, Wonder, Affinity, Confidence, Strength, Desire, Assurance, Comfort, and Consciousness.

It is the first portion of a two-part exhibition on fashion in the United States. Part two, In America: An Anthology of Fashion—which opened in the American Wing period rooms on May 7, 2022—presented sartorial narratives that relate to the complex and layered histories of those rooms.

References

Further reading

External links
 

Metropolitan Museum of Art exhibitions
2021 in art
2021 in fashion